This is a list of the bird species recorded in Gabon. The avifauna of Gabon include a total of 765 species.

This list's taxonomic treatment (designation and sequence of orders, families and species) and nomenclature (common and scientific names) follow the conventions of The Clements Checklist of Birds of the World, 2022 edition. The family accounts at the beginning of each heading reflect this taxonomy, as do the species counts found in each family account. Accidental species are included in the total species count for Gabon.

The following tag has been used to highlight accidentals. The commonly occurring native species are untagged.

 (A) Accidental - a species that rarely or accidentally occurs in Gabon

Ducks, geese, and waterfowl
Order: AnseriformesFamily: Anatidae

Anatidae includes the ducks and most duck-like waterfowl, such as geese and swans. These birds are adapted to an aquatic existence with webbed feet, flattened bills, and feathers that are excellent at shedding water due to an oily coating.

White-faced whistling-duck, Dendrocygna viduata
Fulvous whistling-duck, Dendrocygna bicolor
Knob-billed duck, Sarkidiornis melanotos
Hartlaub's duck, Pteronetta hartlaubii
Egyptian goose, Alopochen aegyptiacus
Spur-winged goose, Plectropterus gambensis
African pygmy-goose, Nettapus auritus
Garganey, Spatula querquedula
African black duck, Anas sparsa
Northern pintail, Anas acuta (A)
Common pochard, Aythya ferina

Guineafowl
Order: GalliformesFamily: Numididae

Guineafowl are a group of African, seed-eating, ground-nesting birds that resemble partridges, but with featherless heads and spangled grey plumage.

Helmeted guineafowl, Numida meleagris
Black guineafowl, Agelastes niger
Plumed guineafowl, Guttera plumifera
Western crested guineafowl, Guttera verreauxi

New World quail
Order: GalliformesFamily: Odontophoridae

The New World quails are small, plump terrestrial birds only distantly related to the quails of the Old World, but named for their similar appearance and habits.

 Stone partridge, Ptilopachus petrosus

Pheasants, grouse, and allies
Order: GalliformesFamily: Phasianidae

The Phasianidae are a family of terrestrial birds which consists of quails, snowcocks, francolins, spurfowls, tragopans, monals, pheasants, peafowls and jungle fowls. In general, they are plump (although they vary in size) and have broad, relatively short wings.

Latham's francolin, Peliperdix  lathami
Coqui francolin, Campocolinus coqui
White-throated francolin, Campocolinus albogularis
Finsch's francolin, Scleroptila finschi
Blue quail, Synoicus adansonii
Harlequin quail, Coturnix delegorguei
Scaly francolin, Pternistis squamatus
Red-necked francolin, Pternistis afer

Flamingos
Order: PhoenicopteriformesFamily: Phoenicopteridae

Flamingos filter-feed on shellfish and algae. Their oddly shaped beaks are specially adapted to separate mud and silt from the food they consume and, uniquely, are used upside-down.

Greater flamingo, Phoenicopterus roseus
Lesser flamingo, Phoenicopterus minor

Grebes
Order: PodicipediformesFamily: Podicipedidae

Grebes are small to medium-large freshwater diving birds. They have lobed toes and are excellent swimmers and divers. However, they have their feet placed far back on the body, making them quite ungainly on land.

Little grebe, Tachybaptus ruficollis
Great crested grebe, Podiceps cristatus

Pigeons and doves
Order: ColumbiformesFamily: Columbidae

Pigeons and doves are stout-bodied birds with short necks and short slender bills with a fleshy cere.

Rock pigeon, Columba livia
Afep pigeon, Columba unicincta
Bronze-naped pigeon, Columba iriditorques
Lemon dove, Columba larvata
European turtle-dove, Streptopelia turtur
Red-eyed dove, Streptopelia semitorquata
Ring-necked dove, Streptopelia capicola
Laughing dove, Streptopelia senegalensis
Emerald-spotted wood-dove, Turtur chalcospilos
Blue-spotted wood-dove, Turtur afer
Tambourine dove, Turtur tympanistria
Blue-headed wood-dove, Turtur brehmeri
Namaqua dove, Oena capensis
African green-pigeon, Treron calva

Bustards
Order: OtidiformesFamily: Otididae

Bustards are large terrestrial birds mainly associated with dry open country and steppes in the Old World. They are omnivorous and nest on the ground. They walk steadily on strong legs and big toes, pecking for food as they go. They have long broad wings with "fingered" wingtips and striking patterns in flight. Many have interesting mating displays.

Denham's bustard, Neotis denhami (A)
White-bellied bustard, Eupodotis senegalensis
Black-bellied bustard, Lissotis melanogaster

Turacos
Order: MusophagiformesFamily: Musophagidae

The turacos, plantain eaters and go-away-birds make up the bird family Musophagidae. They are medium-sized arboreal birds. The turacos and plantain eaters are brightly coloured, usually in blue, green or purple. The go-away birds are mostly grey and white.

Great blue turaco, Corythaeola cristata
Guinea turaco, Tauraco persa
Yellow-billed turaco, Tauraco macrorhynchus
Ross's turaco, Musophaga rossae
Western plantain-eater, Crinifer piscator

Cuckoos
Order: CuculiformesFamily: Cuculidae

The family Cuculidae includes cuckoos, roadrunners and anis. These birds are of variable size with slender bodies, long tails and strong legs. The Old World cuckoos are brood parasites.

Gabon coucal, Centropus anselli
Black-throated coucal, Centropus leucogaster
Senegal coucal, Centropus senegalensis
Blue-headed coucal, Centropus monachus
White-browed coucal, Centropus superciliosus
Black coucal, Centropus grillii
Blue malkoha, Ceuthmochares aereus
Great spotted cuckoo, Clamator glandarius (A)
Levaillant's cuckoo, Clamator levaillantii
Pied cuckoo, Clamator jacobinus
Thick-billed cuckoo, Pachycoccyx audeberti
Dideric cuckoo, Chrysococcyx caprius
Klaas's cuckoo, Chrysococcyx klaas
Yellow-throated cuckoo, Chrysococcyx flavigularis
African emerald cuckoo, Chrysococcyx cupreus
Dusky long-tailed cuckoo, Cercococcyx mechowi
Olive long-tailed cuckoo, Cercococcyx olivinus
Black cuckoo, Cuculus clamosus
Red-chested cuckoo, Cuculus solitarius
African cuckoo, Cuculus gularis
Common cuckoo, Cuculus canorus

Nightjars and allies
Order: CaprimulgiformesFamily: Caprimulgidae

Nightjars are medium-sized nocturnal birds that usually nest on the ground. They have long wings, short legs and very short bills. Most have small feet, of little use for walking, and long pointed wings. Their soft plumage is camouflaged to resemble bark or leaves.

Pennant-winged nightjar, Caprimulgus vexillarius
Standard-winged nightjar, Caprimulgus longipennis
Brown nightjar, Caprimulgus binotatus
Eurasian nightjar, Caprimulgus europaeus
Rufous-cheeked nightjar, Caprimulgus rufigenaFiery-necked nightjar, Caprimulgus pectoralis 
Swamp nightjar, Caprimulgus natalensisPlain nightjar, Caprimulgus inornatus (A)
Freckled nightjar, Caprimulgus tristigmaBates's nightjar, Caprimulgus batesiLong-tailed nightjar, Caprimulgus climacurusSquare-tailed nightjar, Caprimulgus fossiiSwifts
Order: CaprimulgiformesFamily: Apodidae

Swifts are small birds which spend the majority of their lives flying. These birds have very short legs and never settle voluntarily on the ground, perching instead only on vertical surfaces. Many swifts have long swept-back wings which resemble a crescent or boomerang.

Mottled spinetail, Telacanthura ussheriBlack spinetail, Telacanthura melanopygiaSabine's spinetail, Rhaphidura sabiniCassin's spinetail, Neafrapus cassiniAlpine swift, Apus melbaMottled swift, Apus aequatorialisCommon swift, Apus apusNyanza swift, Apus niansaeAfrican swift, Apus barbatus (A)
Little swift, Apus affinisHorus swift, Apus horusWhite-rumped swift, Apus cafferBates's swift, Apus batesiAfrican palm-swift, Cypsiurus parvusFlufftails
Order: GruiformesFamily: Sarothruridae

The flufftails are a small family of ground-dwelling birds found only in Madagascar and sub-Saharan Africa.

White-spotted flufftail, Sarothrura pulchraBuff-spotted flufftail, Sarothrura elegansRed-chested flufftail, Sarothrura rufaChestnut-headed flufftail, Sarothrura lugensStreaky-breasted flufftail, Sarothrura boehmiRails, gallinules and coots
Order: GruiformesFamily: Rallidae

Rallidae is a large family of small to medium-sized birds which includes the rails, crakes, coots and gallinules. Typically they inhabit dense vegetation in damp environments near lakes, swamps or rivers. In general they are shy and secretive birds, making them difficult to observe. Most species have strong legs and long toes which are well adapted to soft uneven surfaces. They tend to have short, rounded wings and to be weak fliers.

African rail, Rallus caerulescensCorn crake, Crex crex (A)
African crake, Crex egregiaGray-throated rail, Canirallus oculeusLesser moorhen, Paragallinula angulataEurasian moorhen, Gallinula chloropusAllen's gallinule, Porphyrio alleniAfrican swamphen, Porphyrio madagascariensisNkulengu rail, Himantornis haematopusStriped crake, Amaurornis marginalisBlack crake, Zapornia flavirostrisLittle crake, Zapornia parvaFinfoots
Order: GruiformesFamily: Heliornithidae

Heliornithidae is a small family of tropical birds with webbed lobes on their feet similar to those of grebes and coots.

African finfoot, Podica senegalensisCranes
Order: GruiformesFamily: Gruidae

Cranes are large, long-legged and long-necked birds. Unlike the similar-looking but unrelated herons, cranes fly with necks outstretched, not pulled back. Most have elaborate and noisy courting displays or "dances".

Black crowned-crane, Balearica pavoninaThick-knees
Order: CharadriiformesFamily: Burhinidae

The thick-knees are a group of largely tropical waders in the family Burhinidae. They are found worldwide within the tropical zone, with some species also breeding in temperate Europe and Australia. They are medium to large waders with strong black or yellow-black bills, large yellow eyes and cryptic plumage. Despite being classed as waders, most species have a preference for arid or semi-arid habitats.

Water thick-knee, Burhinus vermiculatusSpotted thick-knee, Burhinus capensisEgyptian plover
Order: CharadriiformesFamily: Pluvianidae

The Egyptian plover is found across equatorial Africa and along the Nile River.

Egyptian plover, Pluvianus aegyptiusStilts and avocets
Order: CharadriiformesFamily: Recurvirostridae

Recurvirostridae is a family of large wading birds, which includes the avocets and stilts. The avocets have long legs and long up-curved bills. The stilts have extremely long legs and long, thin, straight bills.

Black-winged stilt, Himantopus himantopusPied avocet, Recurvirostra avosettaOystercatchers
Order: CharadriiformesFamily: Haematopodidae

The oystercatchers are large and noisy plover-like birds, with strong bills used for smashing or prising open molluscs.

Eurasian oystercatcher, Haematopus ostralegusPlovers and lapwings
Order: CharadriiformesFamily: Charadriidae

The family Charadriidae includes the plovers, dotterels and lapwings. They are small to medium-sized birds with compact bodies, short, thick necks and long, usually pointed, wings. They are found in open country worldwide, mostly in habitats near water.

Black-bellied plover, Pluvialis squatarolaPacific golden-plover, Pluvialis fulva 
Spur-winged lapwing, Vanellus spinosus (A) 
White-headed lapwing, Vanellus albicepsSenegal lapwing, Vanellus lugubrisBrown-chested lapwing, Vanellus superciliosusLesser sand-plover, Charadrius mongolus (A)
Greater sand-plover, Charadrius leschenaultii (A)
Caspian plover, Charadrius asiaticus (A)
Kittlitz's plover, Charadrius pecuariusKentish plover, Charadrius alexandrinusCommon ringed plover, Charadrius hiaticulaLittle ringed plover, Charadrius dubiusThree-banded plover, Charadrius tricollarisForbes's plover, Charadrius forbesiWhite-fronted plover, Charadrius marginatusPainted-snipes
Order: CharadriiformesFamily: Rostratulidae

Painted-snipes are short-legged, long-billed birds similar in shape to the true snipes, but more brightly coloured.

Greater painted-snipe, Rostratula benghalensisJacanas
Order: CharadriiformesFamily: Jacanidae

The jacanas are a group of tropical waders in the family Jacanidae. They are found throughout the tropics. They are identifiable by their huge feet and claws which enable them to walk on floating vegetation in the shallow lakes that are their preferred habitat.

African jacana, Actophilornis africanusSandpipers and allies
Order: CharadriiformesFamily: Scolopacidae

Scolopacidae is a large diverse family of small to medium-sized shorebirds including the sandpipers, curlews, godwits, shanks, tattlers, woodcocks, snipes, dowitchers, and phalaropes. The majority of these species eat small invertebrates picked out of the mud or soil. Variation in length of legs and bills enables multiple species to feed in the same habitat, particularly on the coast, without direct competition for food.

Upland sandpiper, Bartramia longicauda (A)
Whimbrel, Numenius phaeopusEurasian curlew, Numenius arquataBar-tailed godwit, Limosa lapponicaBlack-tailed godwit, Limosa limosa (A)
Ruddy turnstone, Arenaria interpresRed knot, Calidris canutusRuff, Calidris pugnaxBroad-billed sandpiper, Calidris falcinellus (A)
Curlew sandpiper, Calidris ferrugineaLong-toed stint, Calidris subminutaSanderling, Calidris albaLittle stint, Calidris minutaBuff-breasted sandpiper, Calidris subruficollis (A)
Pectoral sandpiper, Calidris melanotos (A)
Great snipe, Gallinago mediaCommon snipe, Gallinago gallinagoTerek sandpiper, Xenus cinereus (A)
Wilson's phalarope, Phalaropus tricolor (A)
Common sandpiper, Actitis hypoleucosGreen sandpiper, Tringa ochropusSpotted redshank, Tringa erythropusCommon greenshank, Tringa nebulariaMarsh sandpiper, Tringa stagnatilisWood sandpiper, Tringa glareolaCommon redshank, Tringa totanusButtonquail
Order: CharadriiformesFamily: Turnicidae

The buttonquail are small, drab, running birds which resemble the true quails. The female is the brighter of the sexes and initiates courtship. The male incubates the eggs and tends the young.

Small buttonquail, Turnix sylvaticaBlack-rumped buttonquail, Turnix nanusPratincoles and coursers
Order: CharadriiformesFamily: Glareolidae

Glareolidae is a family of wading birds comprising the pratincoles, which have short legs, long pointed wings and long forked tails, and the coursers, which have long legs, short wings and long, pointed bills which curve downwards.

Temminck's courser, Cursorius temminckiiBronze-winged courser, Rhinoptilus chalcopterus (A)
Collared pratincole, Glareola pratincolaBlack-winged pratincole, Glareola nordmanni (A)
Rock pratincole, Glareola nuchalisGray pratincole, Glareola cinereaSkuas and jaegers
Order: CharadriiformesFamily: Stercorariidae

The family Stercorariidae are, in general, medium to large birds, typically with grey or brown plumage, often with white markings on the wings. They nest on the ground in temperate and arctic regions and are long-distance migrants.

Pomarine jaeger, Stercorarius pomarinusParasitic jaeger, Stercorarius parasiticusLong-tailed jaeger, Stercorarius longicaudusGulls, terns, and skimmers
Order: CharadriiformesFamily: Laridae

Laridae is a family of medium to large seabirds, the gulls, terns and skimmers. Gulls are typically grey or white, often with black markings on the head or wings. They have stout, longish bills and webbed feet. Terns are a group of generally medium to large seabirds typically with grey or white plumage, often with black markings on the head. Most terns hunt fish by diving but some pick insects off the surface of fresh water. Terns are generally long-lived birds, with several species known to live in excess of 30 years. Skimmers are a small family of tropical tern-like birds. They have an elongated lower mandible which they use to feed by flying low over the water surface and skimming the water for small fish.

Sabine's gull, Xema sabiniBlack-headed gull, Chroicocephalus ridibundus (A)
Little gull, Hydrocoloeus minutus (A)
Audouin's gull, Ichthyaetus audouiniiCaspian gull, Larus cachinnansLesser black-backed gull, Larus fuscusKelp gull, Larus dominicanusBrown noddy, Anous stolidus (A)
Black noddy, Anous minutus (A)
Little tern, Sternula albifronsDamara tern, Sternula balaenarumCaspian tern, Hydroprogne caspiaBlack tern, Chlidonias nigerWhite-winged tern, Chlidonias leucopterusCommon tern, Sterna hirundoArctic tern, Sterna paradisaeaSandwich tern, Thalasseus sandvicensis
Lesser crested tern, Thalasseus bengalensis (A)
West African crested tern, Thalasseus albididorsalis
African skimmer, Rynchops flavirostris

TropicbirdsOrder: PhaethontiformesFamily: Phaethontidae

Tropicbirds are slender white birds of tropical oceans, with exceptionally long central tail feathers. Their heads and long wings have black markings.

Red-billed tropicbird, Phaethon aethereus (A)

PenguinsOrder: SphenisciformesFamily: Spheniscidae

The penguins are a group of aquatic, flightless birds living almost exclusively in the Southern Hemisphere. Most penguins feed on krill, fish, squid and other forms of sealife caught while swimming underwater.

African penguin, Spheniscus demersus (A)

AlbatrossesOrder: ProcellariiformesFamily: Diomedeidae

The albatrosses are among the largest of flying birds, and the great albatrosses from the genus Diomedea have the largest wingspans of any extant birds.

Yellow-nosed albatross, Thalassarche chlororhynchos
Wandering albatross, Diomedea exulans

Southern storm-petrelsOrder: ProcellariiformesFamily: Oceanitidae

The southern storm-petrels are relatives of the petrels and are the smallest seabirds. They feed on planktonic crustaceans and small fish picked from the surface, typically while hovering. The flight is fluttering and sometimes bat-like.

Wilson's storm-petrel, Oceanites oceanicus

Northern storm-petrelsOrder: ProcellariiformesFamily: Hydrobatidae

Though the members of this family are similar in many respects to the southern storm-petrels, including their general appearance and habits, there are enough genetic differences to warrant their placement in a separate family.

Band-rumped storm-petrel, Hydrobates castro

Shearwaters and petrelsOrder: ProcellariiformesFamily: Procellariidae

The procellariids are the main group of medium-sized "true petrels", characterised by united nostrils with medium septum and a long outer functional primary.

Southern giant-petrel, Macronectes giganteus
Great shearwater, Ardenna gravis (A)
Sooty shearwater, Ardenna griseus

StorksOrder: CiconiiformesFamily: Ciconiidae

Storks are large, long-legged, long-necked, wading birds with long, stout bills. Storks are mute, but bill-clattering is an important mode of communication at the nest. Their nests can be large and may be reused for many years. Many species are migratory.

African openbill, Anastomus lamelligerus
Abdim's stork, Ciconia abdimii
African woolly-necked stork, Ciconia microscelis
White stork, Ciconia ciconia
Saddle-billed stork, Ephippiorhynchus senegalensis
Marabou stork, Leptoptilos crumenifer
Yellow-billed stork, Mycteria ibis

Boobies and gannetsOrder: SuliformesFamily: Sulidae

The sulids comprise the gannets and boobies. Both groups are medium to large coastal seabirds that plunge-dive for fish.

Brown booby, Sula leucogaster
Cape gannet, Morus capensis

AnhingasOrder: SuliformesFamily: Anhingidae

Anhingas or darters are often called "snake-birds" because of their long thin neck, which gives a snake-like appearance when they swim with their bodies submerged. The males have black and dark-brown plumage, an erectile crest on the nape and a larger bill than the female. The females have much paler plumage especially on the neck and underparts. The darters have completely webbed feet and their legs are short and set far back on the body. Their plumage is somewhat permeable, like that of cormorants, and they spread their wings to dry after diving.

African darter, Anhinga melanogaster

Cormorants and shagsOrder: SuliformesFamily: Phalacrocoracidae

Phalacrocoracidae is a family of medium to large coastal, fish-eating seabirds that includes cormorants and shags. Plumage colouration varies, with the majority having mainly dark plumage, some species being black-and-white and a few being colourful.

Long-tailed cormorant, Microcarbo africanus
Cape cormorant, Phalacrocorax capensis (A)
Great cormorant, Phalacrocorax carbo

PelicansOrder: PelecaniformesFamily: Pelecanidae

Pelicans are large water birds with a distinctive pouch under their beak. As with other members of the order Pelecaniformes, they have webbed feet with four toes.

Great white pelican, Pelecanus onocrotalus
Pink-backed pelican, Pelecanus rufescens

HammerkopOrder: PelecaniformesFamily: Scopidae

The hammerkop is a medium-sized bird with a long shaggy crest. The shape of its head with a curved bill and crest at the back is reminiscent of a hammer, hence its name. Its plumage is drab-brown all over.

Hamerkop, Scopus umbretta

Herons, egrets, and bitternsOrder: PelecaniformesFamily: Ardeidae

The family Ardeidae contains the bitterns, herons and egrets. Herons and egrets are medium to large wading birds with long necks and legs. Bitterns tend to be shorter necked and more wary. Members of Ardeidae fly with their necks retracted, unlike other long-necked birds such as storks, ibises and spoonbills.

Great bittern, Botaurus stellaris (A)
Little bittern, Ixobrychus minutus
Dwarf bittern, Ixobrychus sturmii (A) 
White-crested bittern, Tigriornis leucolophus
Gray heron, Ardea cinerea
Black-headed heron, Ardea melanocephala
Goliath heron, Ardea goliath
Purple heron, Ardea purpurea
Great egret, Ardea alba
Intermediate egret, Ardea intermedia
Little egret, Egretta garzetta
Western reef-heron, Egretta gularis
Black heron, Egretta ardesiaca (A) 
Cattle egret, Bubulcus ibis
Squacco heron, Ardeola ralloides
Striated heron, Butorides striata
Black-crowned night-heron, Nycticorax nycticorax
White-backed night-heron, Gorsachius leuconotus

Ibises and spoonbillsOrder: PelecaniformesFamily: Threskiornithidae

Threskiornithidae is a family of large terrestrial and wading birds which includes the ibises and spoonbills. They have long, broad wings with 11 primary and about 20 secondary feathers. They are strong fliers and despite their size and weight, very capable soarers.

Glossy ibis, Plegadis falcinellus
African sacred ibis, Threskiornis aethiopicus
Olive ibis, Bostrychia olivacea
Spot-breasted ibis, Bostrychia rara
Hadada ibis, Bostrychia hagedash
African spoonbill, Platalea alba

SecretarybirdOrder: AccipitriformesFamily: Sagittariidae

The secretarybird is a bird of prey in the order Accipitriformes but is easily distinguished from other raptors by its long crane-like legs.

Secretarybird, Sagittarius serpentarius

OspreyOrder: AccipitriformesFamily: Pandionidae

The family Pandionidae contains only one species, the osprey. The osprey is a medium-large raptor which is a specialist fish-eater with a worldwide distribution.

Osprey, Pandion haliaetus

Hawks, eagles, and kitesOrder: AccipitriformesFamily: Accipitridae

Accipitridae is a family of birds of prey, which includes hawks, eagles, kites, harriers and Old World vultures. These birds have powerful hooked beaks for tearing flesh from their prey, strong legs, powerful talons and keen eyesight.

Black-winged kite, Elanus caeruleus
Scissor-tailed kite, Chelictinia riocourii
African harrier-hawk, Polyboroides typus
Palm-nut vulture, Gypohierax angolensis
European honey-buzzard, Pernis apivorus
Oriental honey-buzzard, Pernis ptilorhynchus (A)
African cuckoo-hawk, Aviceda cuculoides
White-headed vulture, Trigonoceps occipitalis
White-backed vulture, Gyps africanus
Bateleur, Terathopius ecaudatus
Congo serpent-eagle, Dryotriorchis spectabilis
Black-chested snake-eagle, Circaetus pectoralis (A)
Brown snake-eagle, Circaetus cinereus (A)
Bat hawk, Macheiramphus alcinus
Crowned eagle, Stephanoaetus coronatus
Martial eagle, Polemaetus bellicosus
Long-crested eagle, Lophaetus occipitalis
Lesser spotted eagle, Clanga pomarina
Wahlberg's eagle, Hieraaetus wahlbergi (A)
Booted eagle, Hieraaetus pennatus (A)
Ayres's hawk-eagle, Hieraaetus ayresii
Tawny eagle, Aquila rapax
Steppe eagle, Aquila nipalensis
Cassin's hawk-eagle, Aquila africana
African hawk-eagle, Aquila spilogaster
Lizard buzzard, Kaupifalco monogrammicus
Dark chanting-goshawk, Melierax metabates (A)
Gabar goshawk, Micronisus gabar
Eurasian marsh-harrier, Circus aeruginosus
African marsh-harrier, Circus ranivorus
African goshawk, Accipiter tachiro
Chestnut-flanked sparrowhawk, Accipiter castanilius
Shikra, Accipiter badius
Red-thighed sparrowhawk, Accipiter erythropus
Little sparrowhawk, Accipiter minullus
Black goshawk, Accipiter melanoleucus
Long-tailed hawk, Urotriorchis macrourus
Black kite, Milvus migrans
African fish-eagle, Haliaeetus vocifer
Common buzzard, Buteo buteo
Red-necked buzzard, Buteo auguralis

Barn-owlsOrder: StrigiformesFamily: Tytonidae

Barn-owls are medium to large owls with large heads and characteristic heart-shaped faces. They have long strong legs with powerful talons.

African grass-owl, Tyto capensis (A)
Barn owl, Tyto alba

OwlsOrder: StrigiformesFamily: Strigidae

The typical owls are small to large solitary nocturnal birds of prey. They have large forward-facing eyes and ears, a hawk-like beak and a conspicuous circle of feathers around each eye called a facial disk.

Sandy scops-owl, Otus icterorhynchus
African scops-owl, Otus senegalensis
Northern white-faced owl, Ptilopsis leucotis
Southern white-faced owl, Ptilopsis granti
Maned owl, Jubula lettii
Spotted eagle-owl, Bubo africanus
Grayish eagle-owl, Bubo cinerascens
Fraser's eagle-owl, Bubo poensis
Shelley's eagle-owl, Bubo shelleyi
Verreaux's eagle-owl, Bubo lacteus
Akun eagle-owl, Bubo leucostictus
Pel's fishing-owl, Scotopelia peli
Vermiculated fishing-owl, Scotopelia bouvieri
Pearl-spotted owlet, Glaucidium perlatum
Red-chested owlet, Glaucidium tephronotum
Sjöstedt's owlet, Glaucidium sjostedti
African wood-owl, Strix woodfordii
Marsh owl, Asio capensis

MousebirdsOrder: ColiiformesFamily: Coliidae

The mousebirds are slender greyish or brown birds with soft, hairlike body feathers and very long thin tails. They are arboreal and scurry through the leaves like rodents in search of berries, fruit and buds. They are acrobatic and can feed upside down. All species have strong claws and reversible outer toes. They also have crests and stubby bills.

Speckled mousebird, Colius striatus
Red-backed mousebird, Colius castanotus

TrogonsOrder: TrogoniformesFamily: Trogonidae

The family Trogonidae includes trogons and quetzals. Found in tropical woodlands worldwide, they feed on insects and fruit, and their broad bills and weak legs reflect their diet and arboreal habits. Although their flight is fast, they are reluctant to fly any distance. Trogons have soft, often colourful, feathers with distinctive male and female plumage.

Narina trogon, Apaloderma narina
Bare-cheeked trogon, Apaloderma aequatoriale

HoopoesOrder: BucerotiformesFamily: Upupidae

Hoopoes have black, white and orangey-pink colouring with a large erectile crest on their head.

Eurasian hoopoe, Upupa epops

Woodhoopoes and scimitarbillsOrder: BucerotiformesFamily: Phoeniculidae

The woodhoopoes are related to the kingfishers, rollers and hoopoes. They most resemble the hoopoes with their long curved bills, used to probe for insects, and short rounded wings. However, they differ in that they have metallic plumage, often blue, green or purple, and lack an erectile crest.

Forest woodhoopoe, Phoeniculus castaneiceps
Black scimitarbill, Rhinopomastus aterrimus

HornbillsOrder: BucerotiformesFamily: Bucerotidae

Hornbills are a group of birds whose bill is shaped like a cow's horn, but without a twist, sometimes with a casque on the upper mandible. Frequently, the bill is brightly coloured. .

Red-billed dwarf hornbill, Lophoceros camurus
African pied hornbill, Lophoceros fasciatus
African gray hornbill, Lophoceros nasutus
White-crested hornbill, Horizocerus albocristatus
Black dwarf hornbill, Horizocerus hartlaubi
Black-casqued hornbill, Ceratogymna atrata
Black-and-white-casqued hornbill, Bycanistes subcylindricus
Brown-cheeked hornbill, Bycanistes cylindricus
White-thighed hornbill, Bycanistes albotibialis
Piping hornbill, Bycanistes fistulator

KingfishersOrder: CoraciiformesFamily: Alcedinidae

Kingfishers are medium-sized birds with large heads, long, pointed bills, short legs and stubby tails.

Shining-blue kingfisher, Alcedo quadribrachys
Malachite kingfisher, Corythornis cristatus
White-bellied kingfisher, Corythornis leucogaster
African pygmy kingfisher, Ispidina picta
African dwarf kingfisher, Ispidina lecontei
Chocolate-backed kingfisher, Halcyon badia
Gray-headed kingfisher, Halcyon leucocephala
Woodland kingfisher, Halcyon senegalensis
Blue-breasted kingfisher, Halcyon malimbica
Brown-hooded kingfisher, Halcyon albiventris
Striped kingfisher, Halcyon chelicuti
Giant kingfisher, Megaceryle maximus
Pied kingfisher, Ceryle rudis

Bee-eatersOrder: CoraciiformesFamily: Meropidae

The bee-eaters are a group of near passerine birds in the family Meropidae. Most species are found in Africa but others occur in southern Europe, Madagascar, Australia and New Guinea. They are characterised by richly coloured plumage, slender bodies and usually elongated central tail feathers. All are colourful and have long downturned bills and pointed wings, which give them a swallow-like appearance when seen from afar.

Black bee-eater, Merops gularis
Blue-headed bee-eater, Merops muelleri
White-fronted bee-eater, Merops bullockoides
Little bee-eater, Merops pusillus
Blue-breasted bee-eater, Merops variegatus
Swallow-tailed bee-eater, Merops hirundineus
Black-headed bee-eater, Merops breweri
White-throated bee-eater, Merops albicollis
Blue-cheeked bee-eater, Merops persicus
European bee-eater, Merops apiaster
Rosy bee-eater, Merops malimbicus

RollersOrder: CoraciiformesFamily': Coraciidae

Rollers resemble crows in size and build, but are more closely related to the kingfishers and bee-eaters. They share the colourful appearance of those groups with blues and browns predominating. The two inner front toes are connected, but the outer toe is not.

European roller, Coracias garrulusLilac-breasted roller, Coracias caudataRacket-tailed roller, Coracias spatulataBroad-billed roller, Eurystomus glaucurusBlue-throated roller, Eurystomus gularis'

African barbets
Order: PiciformesFamily: Lybiidae

The African barbets are plump birds, with short necks and large heads. They get their name from the bristles which fringe their heavy bills. Most species are brightly coloured.

Yellow-billed barbet, Trachyphonus purpuratus
Yellow-breasted barbet, Trachyphonus margaritatus
Gray-throated barbet, Gymnobucco bonapartei
Bristle-nosed barbet, Gymnobucco peli
Naked-faced barbet, Gymnobucco calvus
Speckled tinkerbird, Pogoniulus scolopaceus
Red-rumped tinkerbird, Pogoniulus atroflavus
Yellow-throated tinkerbird, Pogoniulus subsulphureus
Yellow-rumped tinkerbird, Pogoniulus bilineatus
Yellow-spotted barbet, Buccanodon duchaillui
Hairy-breasted barbet, Tricholaema hirsuta
Black-backed barbet, Lybius minor
Double-toothed barbet, Lybius bidentatus

Honeyguides
Order: PiciformesFamily: Indicatoridae

Honeyguides are among the few birds that feed on wax. They are named for the greater honeyguide which leads traditional honey-hunters to bees' nests and, after the hunters have harvested the honey, feeds on the remaining contents of the hive.

Cassin's honeyguide, Prodotiscus insignis
Zenker's honeyguide, Melignomon zenkeri
Willcocks's honeyguide, Indicator willcocksi
Least honeyguide, Indicator exilis
Lesser honeyguide, Indicator minor
Spotted honeyguide, Indicator maculatus
Greater honeyguide, Indicator indicator
Lyre-tailed honeyguide, Melichneutes robustus

Woodpeckers
Order: PiciformesFamily: Picidae

Woodpeckers are small to medium-sized birds with chisel-like beaks, short legs, stiff tails and long tongues used for capturing insects. Some species have feet with two toes pointing forward and two backward, while several species have only three toes. Many woodpeckers have the habit of tapping noisily on tree trunks with their beaks.

Rufous-necked wryneck, Jynx ruficollis
African piculet, Verreauxia africana
Gabon woodpecker, Chloropicus gabonensis
Elliot's woodpecker, Chloropicus elliotii
Cardinal woodpecker, Chloropicus fuscescens
Golden-crowned woodpecker, Chloropicus xantholophus
African gray woodpecker, Chloropicus goertae
Brown-eared woodpecker, Campethera caroli
Buff-spotted woodpecker, Campethera nivosa
Green-backed woodpecker, Campethera cailliautii
Golden-tailed woodpecker, Campethera abingoni

Falcons and caracaras
Order: FalconiformesFamily: Falconidae

Falconidae is a family of diurnal birds of prey. They differ from hawks, eagles and kites in that they kill with their beaks instead of their talons.

Lesser kestrel, Falco naumanni
Eurasian kestrel, Falco tinnunculus
Gray kestrel, Falco ardosiaceus
Red-footed falcon, Falco vespertinus (A)
Amur falcon, Falco amurensis (A)
Eleonora's falcon, Falco eleonorae
Eurasian hobby, Falco subbuteo
African hobby, Falco cuvierii
Lanner falcon, Falco biarmicus (A)
Peregrine falcon, Falco peregrinus

Old World parrots
Order: PsittaciformesFamily: Psittaculidae

Characteristic features of parrots include a strong curved bill, an upright stance, strong legs, and clawed zygodactyl feet. Many parrots are vividly coloured, and some are multi-coloured. Old World parrots are found from Africa east across south and southeast Asia and Oceania to Australia and New Zealand.

Black-collared lovebird, Agapornis swinderniana
Red-headed lovebird, Agapornis pullarius

New World and African parrots
Order: PsittaciformesFamily: Psittacidae

Parrots are small to large birds with a characteristic curved beak. Their upper mandibles have slight mobility in the joint with the skull and they have a generally erect stance. All parrots are zygodactyl, having the four toes on each foot placed two at the front and two to the back. Most of the more than 150 species in this family are found in the New World.

Gray parrot, Psittacus erithacus
Red-fronted parrot, Poicephalus gulielmi

African and green broadbills
Order: PasseriformesFamily: Calyptomenidae

The broadbills are small, brightly coloured birds, which feed on fruit and also take insects in flycatcher fashion, snapping their broad bills. Their habitat is canopies of wet forests.

African broadbill, Smithornis capensis
Gray-headed broadbill, Smithornis sharpei
Rufous-sided broadbill, Smithornis rufolateralis

Pittas
Order: PasseriformesFamily: Pittidae

Pittas are medium-sized by passerine standards and are stocky, with fairly long, strong legs, short tails and stout bills. Many are brightly coloured. They spend the majority of their time on wet forest floors, eating snails, insects and similar invertebrates.

African pitta, Pitta angolensis
Green-breasted pitta, Pitta reichenowi

Cuckooshrikes
Order: PasseriformesFamily: Campephagidae

The cuckooshrikes are small to medium-sized passerine birds. They are predominantly greyish with white and black, although some species are brightly coloured.

Ghana cuckooshrike, Lobotos lobatus
Oriole cuckooshrike, Lobotos oriolinus
Petit's cuckooshrike, Campephaga petiti
Red-shouldered cuckooshrike, Campephaga phoenicea
Purple-throated cuckooshrike, Campephaga quiscalina
Blue cuckooshrike, Cyanograucalus azureus

Old World orioles
Order: PasseriformesFamily: Oriolidae

The Old World orioles are colourful passerine birds. They are not related to the New World orioles.

Eurasian golden oriole, Oriolus oriolus (A)
African golden oriole, Oriolus auratus
Western black-headed oriole, Oriolus brachyrhynchus
Black-winged oriole, Oriolus nigripennis

Wattle-eyes and batises
Order: PasseriformesFamily: Platysteiridae

The wattle-eyes, or puffback flycatchers, are small stout passerine birds of the African tropics. They get their name from the brightly coloured fleshy eye decorations found in most species in this group.

Brown-throated wattle-eye, Platysteira cyanea
Chestnut wattle-eye, Platysteira castanea
White-spotted wattle-eye, Platysteira tonsa
Black-necked wattle-eye, Platysteira chalybea
Yellow-bellied wattle-eye, Platysteira concreta
Chinspot batis, Batis molitor
Western black-headed batis, Batis erlangeri
Verreaux's batis, Batis minima
West African batis, Batis occulta
Angola batis, Batis minulla

Vangas, helmetshrikes, and allies
Order: PasseriformesFamily: Vangidae

The helmetshrikes are similar in build to the shrikes, but tend to be colourful species with distinctive crests or other head ornaments, such as wattles, from which they get their name.

Red-billed helmetshrike, Prionops caniceps
Rufous-bellied helmetshrike, Prionops rufiventris
African shrike-flycatcher, Megabyas flammulatus
Black-and-white shrike-flycatcher, Bias musicus

Bushshrikes and allies
Order: PasseriformesFamily: Malaconotidae

Bushshrikes are similar in habits to shrikes, hunting insects and other small prey from a perch on a bush. Although similar in build to the shrikes, these tend to be either colourful species or largely black; some species are quite secretive.

Brubru, Nilaus afer
Northern puffback, Dryoscopus gambensis
Red-eyed puffback, Dryoscopus senegalensis
Pink-footed puffback, Dryoscopus angolensis
Sabine's puffback, Dryoscopus sabini
Marsh tchagra, Tchagra minuta
Black-crowned tchagra, Tchagra senegala
Brown-crowned tchagra, Tchagra australis
Lühder's bushshrike, Laniarius luehderi
Gabon boubou, Laniarius bicolor
Lowland sooty boubou, Laniarius leucorhynchus
Gray-green bushshrike, Telophorus bocagei
Many-colored bushshrike, Telophorus multicolor
Four-colored bushshrike, Telophorus viridis
Fiery-breasted bushshrike, Malaconotus cruentus

Drongos
Order: PasseriformesFamily: Dicruridae

The drongos are mostly black or dark grey in colour, sometimes with metallic tints. They have long forked tails, and some Asian species have elaborate tail decorations. They have short legs and sit very upright when perched, like a shrike. They flycatch or take prey from the ground.

Sharpe's drongo, Dicrurus sharpei
Shining drongo, Dicrurus atripennis
Fork-tailed drongo, Dicrurus adsimilis
Velvet-mantled drongo, Dicrurus modestus

Monarch flycatchers
Order: PasseriformesFamily: Monarchidae

The monarch flycatchers are small to medium-sized insectivorous passerines which hunt by flycatching.

Blue-headed crested-flycatcher, Trochocercus nitens
Black-headed paradise-flycatcher, Terpsiphone rufiventer
Rufous-vented paradise-flycatcher, Terpsiphone rufocinerea
Bates's paradise-flycatcher, Terpsiphone batesi
African paradise-flycatcher, Terpsiphone viridis

Shrikes
Order: PasseriformesFamily: Laniidae

Shrikes are passerine birds known for their habit of catching other birds and small animals and impaling the uneaten portions of their bodies on thorns. A typical shrike's beak is hooked, like a bird of prey.

Red-backed shrike, Lanius collurio
Red-tailed shrike, Lanius phoenicuroides
Isabelline shrike, Lanius isabellinus (A)
Lesser gray shrike, Lanius minor
Mackinnon's shrike, Lanius mackinnoni
Northern fiscal, Lanius humeralis
Souza's shrike, Lanius souzae
Woodchat shrike, Lanius senator (A)

Crows, jays, and magpies
Order: PasseriformesFamily: Corvidae

The family Corvidae includes crows, ravens, jays, choughs, magpies, treepies, nutcrackers and ground jays. Corvids are above average in size among the Passeriformes, and some of the larger species show high levels of intelligence.

Pied crow, Corvus albus

Rockfowl
Order: PasseriformesFamily: Picathartidae

Rockfowl are lanky birds with crow-like bills, long necks, tails and legs, and strong feet adapted to terrestrial feeding. They are similar in size and structure to the completely unrelated roadrunners, but they hop rather than walk. They also have brightly coloured unfeathered heads.

Gray-necked rockfowl, Picathartes oreas

Hyliotas
Order: PasseriformesFamily: Hyliotidae

The members of this small family, all of genus Hyliota, are birds of the forest canopy. They tend to feed in mixed-species flocks.

Yellow-bellied hyliota, Hyliota flavigaster
Violet-backed hyliota, Hyliota violacea

Fairy flycatchers
Order: PasseriformesFamily: Stenostiridae

Most of the species of this small family are found in Africa, though a few inhabit tropical Asia. They are not closely related to other birds called "flycatchers"

African blue flycatcher, Elminia longicauda
Dusky crested-flycatcher, Elminia nigromitrata

Tits, chickadees, and titmice
Order: PasseriformesFamily: Paridae

The Paridae are mainly small stocky woodland species with short stout bills. Some have crests. They are adaptable birds, with a mixed diet including seeds and insects.

White-shouldered black-tit, Melaniparus guineensis
White-winged black-tit, Melaniparus leucomelas
Rufous-bellied tit, Melaniparus rufiventris
Dusky tit, Melaniparus funereus

Penduline-tits
Order: PasseriformesFamily: Remizidae

The penduline-tits are a group of small passerine birds related to the true tits. They are insectivores.

Forest penduline-tit, Anthoscopus flavifrons
African penduline-tit, Anthoscopus caroli

Larks
Order: PasseriformesFamily: Alaudidae

Larks are small terrestrial birds with often extravagant songs and display flights. Most larks are fairly dull in appearance. Their food is insects and seeds.

Rufous-naped lark, Mirafra africana
Flappet lark, Mirafra rufocinnamomea
Red-capped lark, Calandrella cinerea

Nicators
Order: PasseriformesFamily: Nicatoridae

The nicators are shrike-like, with hooked bills. They are endemic to sub-Saharan Africa.

Western nicator, Nicator chloris
Yellow-throated nicator, Nicator vireo

African warblers
Order: PasseriformesFamily: Macrosphenidae

African warblers are small to medium-sized insectivores which are found in a wide variety of habitats south of the Sahara.

Green crombec, Sylvietta virens
Lemon-bellied crombec, Sylvietta denti
Red-capped crombec, Sylvietta ruficapilla
Moustached grass-warbler, Melocichla mentalis
Yellow longbill, Macrosphenus flavicans
Gray longbill, Macrosphenus concolor
Green hylia, Hylia prasina
Tit-hylia, Pholidornis rushiae

Cisticolas and allies
Order: PasseriformesFamily: Cisticolidae

The Cisticolidae are warblers found mainly in warmer southern regions of the Old World. They are generally very small birds of drab brown or grey appearance found in open country such as grassland or scrub.

Salvadori's eremomela, Eremomela salvadorii
Yellow-bellied eremomela, Eremomela icteropygialis
Greencap eremomela, Eremomela scotops
Rufous-crowned eremomela, Eremomela badiceps
White-chinned prinia, Schistolais leucopogon
Green-backed camaroptera, Camaroptera brachyura
Hartert's camaroptera, Camaroptera harterti
Yellow-browed camaroptera, Camaroptera superciliaris
Olive-green camaroptera, Camaroptera chloronota
Black-capped apalis, Apalis nigriceps
Black-throated apalis, Apalis jacksoni
Masked apalis, Apalis binotata
Yellow-breasted apalis, Apalis flavida
Buff-throated apalis, Apalis rufogularis
Gosling's apalis, Apalis goslingi
Gray apalis, Apalis cinerea
Tawny-flanked prinia, Prinia subflava
Banded prinia, Prinia bairdii
Black-faced rufous-warbler, Bathmocercus rufus
Oriole warbler, Hypergerus atriceps
Red-faced cisticola, Cisticola erythrops
Singing cisticola, Cisticola cantans
Whistling cisticola, Cisticola lateralis
Chattering cisticola, Cisticola anonymus
Rattling cisticola, Cisticola chiniana
Tinkling cisticola, Cisticola rufilatus
Winding cisticola, Cisticola marginatus
Stout cisticola, Cisticola robustus
Croaking cisticola, Cisticola natalensis
Piping cisticola, Cisticola fulvicapillus
Siffling cisticola, Cisticola brachypterus
Zitting cisticola, Cisticola juncidis
Black-backed cisticola, Cisticola eximius
Cloud-scraping cisticola, Cisticola dambo
Pectoral-patch cisticola, Cisticola brunnescens
Pale-crowned cisticola, Cisticola cinnamomeus
Wing-snapping cisticola, Cisticola ayresii

Reed warblers and allies
Order: PasseriformesFamily: Acrocephalidae

The members of this family are usually rather large for "warblers". Most are rather plain olivaceous brown above with much yellow to beige below. They are usually found in open woodland, reedbeds, or tall grass. The family occurs mostly in southern to western Eurasia and surroundings, but it also ranges far into the Pacific, with some species in Africa.

African yellow-warbler, Iduna natalensis
Icterine warbler, Hippolais icterina
Sedge warbler, Acrocephalus schoenobaenus
Common reed warbler, Acrocephalus scirpaceus
Greater swamp warbler, Acrocephalus rufescens
Great reed warbler, Acrocephalus arundinaceus

Grassbirds and allies
Order: PasseriformesFamily: Locustellidae

Locustellidae are a family of small insectivorous songbirds found mainly in Eurasia, Africa, and the Australian region. They are smallish birds with tails that are usually long and pointed, and tend to be drab brownish or buffy all over.

Fan-tailed grassbird, Catriscus brevirostris
Dja River swamp warbler, Bradypterus grandis

Swallows
Order: PasseriformesFamily: Hirundinidae

The family Hirundinidae is adapted to aerial feeding. They have a slender streamlined body, long pointed wings and a short bill with a wide gape. The feet are adapted to perching rather than walking, and the front toes are partially joined at the base.

African river martin, Pseudochelidon eurystomina
Plain martin, Riparia paludicola
Congo martin, Riparia congica
Bank swallow, Riparia riparia
Banded martin, Neophedina cincta
Brazza's martin, Phedinopsis brazzae
Rock martin, Ptyonoprogne fuligula (A)
Barn swallow, Hirundo rustica
Red-chested swallow, Hirundo lucida
Ethiopian swallow, Hirundo aethiopica (A)
Angola swallow, Hirundo angolensis
White-throated blue swallow, Hirundo nigrita
White-throated swallow, Hirundo albigularis
Wire-tailed swallow, Hirundo smithii
Greater striped swallow, Cecropis cucullata
Red-rumped swallow, Cecropis daurica
Lesser striped swallow, Cecropis abyssinica
Rufous-chested swallow, Cecropis semirufa
Mosque swallow, Cecropis senegalensis
Red-throated swallow, Petrochelidon rufigula
Preuss's swallow, Petrochelidon preussi
South African swallow, Petrochelidon spilodera (A)
Forest swallow, Atronanus fuliginosus
Common house-martin, Delichon urbicum
Square-tailed sawwing, Psalidoprocne nitens
Black sawwing, Psalidoprocne pristoptera
Gray-rumped swallow, Pseudhirundo griseopyga

Bulbuls
Order: PasseriformesFamily: Pycnonotidae

Bulbuls are medium-sized songbirds. Some are colourful with yellow, red or orange vents, cheeks, throats or supercilia, but most are drab, with uniform olive-brown to black plumage. Some species have distinct crests.

Slender-billed greenbul, Stelgidillas gracilirostris
Golden greenbul, Calyptocichla serinus
Black-collared bulbul, Neolestes torquatus
Red-tailed bristlebill, Bleda syndactylus
Lesser bristlebill, Bleda notatus
Simple greenbul, Chlorocichla simplex
Yellow-necked greenbul, Chlorocichla falkensteini
Honeyguide greenbul, Baeopogon indicator
Sjostedt's greenbul, Baeopogon clamans
Yellow-throated greenbul, Atimastillas flavicollis
Spotted greenbul, Ixonotus guttatus
Swamp greenbul, Thescelocichla leucopleura
Red-tailed greenbul, Criniger calurus
Eastern bearded-greenbul, Criniger chloronotus
Yellow-bearded greenbul, Criniger olivaceus
White-bearded greenbul, Criniger ndussumensis
Gray greenbul, Eurillas gracilis
Ansorge's greenbul, Eurillas ansorgei
Plain greenbul, Eurillas curvirostris
Yellow-whiskered greenbul, Eurillas latirostris
Little greenbul, Eurillas virens
Leaf-love, Phyllastrephus scandens
Pale-olive greenbul, Phyllastrephus fulviventris
Icterine greenbul, Phyllastrephus icterinus
Xavier's greenbul, Phyllastrephus xavieri
White-throated greenbul, Phyllastrephus albigularis
Common bulbul, Pycnonotus barbatus

Leaf warblers
Order: PasseriformesFamily: Phylloscopidae

Leaf warblers are a family of small insectivorous birds found mostly in Eurasia and ranging into Wallacea and Africa. The species are of various sizes, often green-plumaged above and yellow below, or more subdued with grayish-green to grayish-brown colors.

Wood warbler, Phylloscopus sibilatrix
Western Bonelli's warbler, Phylloscopus bonelli (A)
Willow warbler, Phylloscopus trochilus
Uganda woodland-warbler, Phylloscopus budongoensis

Bush warblers and allies
Order: PasseriformesFamily: Scotocercidae

The members of this family are found throughout Africa, Asia, and Polynesia. Their taxonomy is in flux, and some authorities place genus Erythrocerus in another family.

Chestnut-capped flycatcher, Erythrocercus mccallii

Sylviid warblers, parrotbills, and allies
Order: PasseriformesFamily: Sylviidae

The family Sylviidae is a group of small insectivorous passerine birds. They mainly occur as breeding species, as the common name implies, in Europe, Asia and, to a lesser extent, Africa. Most are of generally undistinguished appearance, but many have distinctive songs.

Garden warbler, Sylvia borin
Greater whitethroat, Curruca communis (A)

White-eyes, yuhinas, and allies
Order: PasseriformesFamily: Zosteropidae

The white-eyes are small and mostly undistinguished, their plumage above being generally some dull colour like greenish-olive, but some species have a white or bright yellow throat, breast or lower parts, and several have buff flanks. As their name suggests, many species have a white ring around each eye.

Forest white-eye, Zosterops stenocricotus
Northern yellow white-eye, Zosterops senegalensis

Ground babblers and allies
Order: PasseriformesFamily: Pellorneidae

These small to medium-sized songbirds have soft fluffy plumage but are otherwise rather diverse. Members of the genus Illadopsis are found in forests, but some other genera are birds of scrublands.

Brown illadopsis, Illadopsis fulvescens
Pale-breasted illadopsis, Illadopsis rufipennis
Blackcap illadopsis, Illadopsis cleaveri

Laughingthrushes and allies
Order: PasseriformesFamily: Leiothrichidae

The members of this family are diverse in size and coloration, though those of genus Turdoides tend to be brown or grayish. The family is found in Africa, India, and southeast Asia.

Brown babbler, Turdoides plebejus
Arrow-marked babbler, Turdoides jardineii
Blackcap babbler, Turdoides reinwardtii

Oxpeckers
Order: PasseriformesFamily: Buphagidae

As both the English and scientific names of these birds imply, they feed on ectoparasites, primarily ticks, found on large mammals.

Yellow-billed oxpecker, Buphagus africanus

Starlings
Order: PasseriformesFamily: Sturnidae

Starlings are small to medium-sized passerine birds. Their flight is strong and direct and they are very gregarious. Their preferred habitat is fairly open country. They eat insects and fruit. Plumage is typically dark with a metallic sheen.

Wattled starling, Creatophora cinerea
Violet-backed starling, Cinnyricinclus leucogaster
Chestnut-winged starling, Onychognathus fulgidus
White-collared starling, Grafisia torquata
Narrow-tailed starling, Poeoptera lugubris
Purple-headed starling, Hylopsar purpureiceps
Splendid starling, Lamprotornis splendidus
Purple starling, Lamprotornis purpureus

Thrushes and allies
Order: PasseriformesFamily: Turdidae

The thrushes are a group of passerine birds that occur mainly in the Old World. They are plump, soft plumaged, small to medium-sized insectivores or sometimes omnivores, often feeding on the ground. Many have attractive songs.

Rufous flycatcher-thrush, Neocossyphus fraseri
Red-tailed ant-thrush, Neocossyphus rufus
White-tailed ant-thrush, Neocossyphus poensis
Black-eared ground-thrush, Geokichla cameronensis
Gray ground-thrush, Geokichla princei
Crossley's ground-thrush, Geokichla crossleyi
African thrush, Turdus pelios

Old World flycatchers
Order: PasseriformesFamily: Muscicapidae

Old World flycatchers are a large group of small passerine birds native to the Old World. They are mainly small arboreal insectivores. The appearance of these birds is highly varied, but they mostly have weak songs and harsh calls.

Little flycatcher, Muscicapa epulata
Yellow-footed flycatcher, Muscicapa sethsmithi
Spotted flycatcher, Muscicapa striata
Cassin's flycatcher, Muscicapa cassini
Sooty flycatcher, Bradornis fuliginosus
Dusky-blue flycatcher, Bradornis comitatus
Pale flycatcher, Agricola pallidus
White-browed forest-flycatcher, Fraseria cinerascens
African forest-flycatcher, Fraseria ocreata
Gray-throated tit-flycatcher, Fraseria griseigularis
Gray tit-flycatcher, Fraseria plumbea
Olivaceous flycatcher, Fraseria olivascens
Tessmann's flycatcher, Fraseria tessmanni
Ashy flycatcher, Fraseria caerulescens
Northern black-flycatcher, Melaenornis edolioides
Fire-crested alethe, Alethe castanea
Red-backed scrub-robin, Cercotrichas leucophrys
Blue-shouldered robin-chat, Cossypha cyanocampter
White-browed robin-chat, Cossypha heuglini
Red-capped robin-chat, Cossypha natalensis
Snowy-crowned robin-chat, Cossypha niveicapilla
Rufous-tailed palm-thrush, Cichladusa ruficauda
Brown-chested alethe, Chamaetylas poliocephala
Olive-backed forest robin, Stiphrornis pyrrholaemus
Orange-breasted forest robin, Stiphrornis erythrothorax
Lowland akalat, Sheppardia cyornithopsis
European pied flycatcher, Ficedula hypoleuca
Whinchat, Saxicola rubetra
African stonechat, Saxicola torquatus
Sooty chat, Myrmecocichla nigra
Congo moorchat, Myrmecocichla tholloni
Northern wheatear, Oenanthe oenanthe (A)
Familiar chat, Oenanthe familiaris

Sunbirds and spiderhunters
Order: PasseriformesFamily: Nectariniidae

The sunbirds and spiderhunters are very small passerine birds which feed largely on nectar, although they will also take insects, especially when feeding young. Flight is fast and direct on their short wings. Most species can take nectar by hovering like a hummingbird, but usually perch to feed.

Fraser's sunbird, Deleornis fraseri
Mouse-brown sunbird, Anthreptes gabonicus
Western violet-backed sunbird, Anthreptes longuemarei
Violet-tailed sunbird, Anthreptes aurantius
Little green sunbird, Anthreptes seimundi
Green sunbird, Anthreptes rectirostris
Collared sunbird, Hedydipna collaris
Reichenbach's sunbird, Anabathmis reichenbachii
Green-headed sunbird, Cyanomitra verticalis
Blue-throated brown sunbird, Cyanomitra cyanolaema
Cameroon sunbird, Cyanomitra oritis
Olive sunbird, Cyanomitra olivacea
Carmelite sunbird, Chalcomitra fuliginosa
Green-throated sunbird, Chalcomitra rubescens
Amethyst sunbird, Chalcomitra amethystina
Olive-bellied sunbird, Cinnyris chloropygius
Tiny sunbird, Cinnyris minullus
Northern double-collared sunbird, Cinnyris preussi
Congo sunbird, Cinnyris congensis
Purple-banded sunbird, Cinnyris bifasciatus
Orange-tufted sunbird, Cinnyris bouvieri
Splendid sunbird, Cinnyris coccinigaster
Johanna's sunbird, Cinnyris johannae
Superb sunbird, Cinnyris superbus
Variable sunbird, Cinnyris venustus
Bates's sunbird, Cinnyris batesi
Copper sunbird, Cinnyris cupreus

Weavers and allies
Order: PasseriformesFamily: Ploceidae

The weavers are small passerine birds related to the finches. They are seed-eating birds with rounded conical bills. The males of many species are brightly coloured, usually in red or yellow and black, some species show variation in colour only in the breeding season.

Red-crowned malimbe, Malimbus coronatus
Black-throated malimbe, Malimbus cassini
Rachel's malimbe, Malimbus racheliae
Red-bellied malimbe, Malimbus erythrogaster
Blue-billed malimbe, Malimbus nitens
Crested malimbe, Malimbus malimbicus
Red-headed malimbe, Malimbus rubricollis
Black-chinned weaver, Ploceus nigrimentum
Slender-billed weaver, Ploceus pelzelni
Loango weaver, Ploceus subpersonatus
Black-necked weaver, Ploceus nigricollis
Spectacled weaver, Ploceus ocularis
Holub's golden-weaver, Ploceus xanthops
Orange weaver, Ploceus aurantius
Lesser masked-weaver, Ploceus intermedius
Heuglin's masked-weaver, Ploceus heuglini
Vieillot's black weaver, Ploceus nigerrimus
Village weaver, Ploceus cucullatus
Black-headed weaver, Ploceus melanocephalus
Yellow-mantled weaver, Ploceus tricolor
Maxwell's black weaver, Ploceus albinucha
Forest weaver, Ploceus bicolor
Yellow-capped weaver, Ploceus dorsomaculatus
Preuss's weaver, Ploceus preussi
Compact weaver, Pachyphantes superciliosus
Red-headed quelea, Quelea erythrops
Red-billed quelea, Quelea quelea
Bob-tailed weaver, Brachycope anomala
Black-winged bishop, Euplectes hordeaceus
Yellow-crowned bishop, Euplectes afer
White-winged widowbird, Euplectes albonotatus
Yellow-mantled widowbird, Euplectes macroura
Red-collared widowbird, Euplectes ardens
Fan-tailed widowbird, Euplectes axillaris
Marsh widowbird, Euplectes hartlaubi
Grosbeak weaver, Amblyospiza albifrons

Waxbills and allies
Order: PasseriformesFamily: Estrildidae

The estrildid finches are small passerine birds of the Old World tropics and Australasia. They are gregarious and often colonial seed eaters with short thick but pointed bills. They are all similar in structure and habits, but have wide variation in plumage colours and patterns.

Bronze mannikin, Spermestes cucullatus
Magpie mannikin, Spermestes fringilloides
Black-and-white mannikin, Spermestes bicolor
Green-backed twinspot, Mandingoa nitidula
Woodhouse's antpecker, Parmoptila woodhousei
White-breasted nigrita, Nigrita fusconota
Chestnut-breasted nigrita, Nigrita bicolor
Gray-headed nigrita, Nigrita canicapilla
Pale-fronted nigrita, Nigrita luteifrons
Black-tailed waxbill, Glaucestrilda perreini
Black-crowned waxbill, Estrilda nonnula
Black-headed waxbill, Estrilda atricapilla
Orange-cheeked waxbill, Estrilda melpoda
Fawn-breasted waxbill, Estrilda paludicola
Common waxbill, Estrilda astrild
Quailfinch, Ortygospiza atricollis
Zebra waxbill, Amandava subflava
Southern cordonbleu, Uraeginthus angolensis
Western bluebill, Spermophaga haematina
Crimson seedcracker, Pyrenestes sanguineus
Black-bellied seedcracker, Pyrenestes ostrinus
Green-winged pytilia, Pytilia melba
Orange-winged pytilia, Pytilia afra
Brown twinspot, Clytospiza monteiri
African firefinch, Lagonosticta rubricata

Indigobirds
Order: PasseriformesFamily: Viduidae

The indigobirds are finch-like species which usually have black or indigo predominating in their plumage. All are brood parasites, which lay their eggs in the nests of estrildid finches.

Pin-tailed whydah, Vidua macroura
Wilson's indigobird, Vidua wilsoni

Old World sparrows
Order: PasseriformesFamily: Passeridae

Old World sparrows are small passerine birds. In general, sparrows tend to be small, plump, brown or grey birds with short tails and short powerful beaks. Sparrows are seed eaters, but they also consume small insects.

House sparrow, Passer domesticus (A)
Northern gray-headed sparrow, Passer griseus
Yellow-throated bush sparrow Gymnoris superciliaris

Wagtails and pipits
Order: PasseriformesFamily: Motacillidae

Motacillidae is a family of small passerine birds with medium to long tails. They include the wagtails, longclaws and pipits. They are slender, ground feeding insectivores of open country.

Mountain wagtail, Motacilla clara
Western yellow wagtail, Motacilla flava
African pied wagtail, Motacilla aguimp
White wagtail, Motacilla alba
Richard's pipit, Anthus richardi
African pipit, Anthus cinnamomeus
Woodland pipit, Anthus nyassae
Long-billed pipt, Anthus similis (A)
Tawny pipit, Anthus campestris
Plain-backed pipit, Anthus leucophrys (A)
Long-legged pipit, Anthus pallidiventris
Tree pipit, Anthus trivialis
Red-throated pipit, Anthus cervinus (A)
Short-tailed pipit, Anthus brachyurus
Yellow-throated longclaw, Macronyx croceus

Finches, euphonias, and allies
Order: PasseriformesFamily: Fringillidae

Finches are seed-eating passerine birds, that are small to moderately large and have a strong beak, usually conical and in some species very large. All have twelve tail feathers and nine primaries. These birds have a bouncing flight with alternating bouts of flapping and gliding on closed wings, and most sing well.

Yellow-fronted canary, Crithagra mozambica
Black-faced canary, Crithagra capistrata
Black-throated canary, Crithagra atrogularis

Old World buntings
Order: PasseriformesFamily: Emberizidae

The emberizids are a large family of passerine birds. They are seed-eating birds with distinctively shaped bills. Many emberizid species have distinctive head patterns.

Cabanis's bunting, Emberiza cabanisi
Golden-breasted bunting, Emberiza flaviventris
Cinnamon-breasted bunting, Emberiza tahapisi

See also
List of birds
Lists of birds by region

References

External links
Birds of Gabon - World Institute for Conservation and Environment

Gabon
Gabon
Birds
Gabon